Randa Cemil Markos-Thomas (born August 10, 1985) is an Iraqi-born Canadian professional mixed martial artist who competes in the strawweight division. She most notably fought in the Ultimate Fighting Championship (UFC).

Personal life
Markos was born in Iraq in 1985. She is ethnically Assyrian. She and her parents are of Chaldean Catholic religious background. At the age of three, she and her family were held at gunpoint and imprisoned during the Iran-Iraq War for trying to escape Iraq. They successfully escaped and boarded a plane to Ontario, Canada that same year.

Markos earned her Pharmacy Assistant Diploma at TriOS College. She then worked as a pharmacy technician at a pharmacy in Windsor.

Mixed martial arts career 
Markos made her pro MMA debut on November 17, 2012 at IFC 51 defeating Allanna Jones via third round armbar.

Markos compiled an unblemished 3–0 record making her RFA debut against future TUF 20 teammate Justine Kish. Markos suffered her first loss that night via decision.

She quickly bounced back by defeating Lynnell House via armbar in the first round and capturing the PFC Strawweight title.

The Ultimate Fighter
Markos was among the final eight contestants that tried out for the TUF house, to join the 11 Invicta FC strawweights that President Dana White had acquired.

Markos was ranked #14 for Team Pettis, and was matched up against #3 ranked Tecia Torres for the first fight of the season. Markos defeated Torres via decision after three rounds to give Team Pettis their first win.

On the ninth episode, Markos was set to take on Felice Herrig in the first quarterfinal match up. Tension began to build when several of the fighters wanted to train separately and have two sessions per day, one in the morning and one at night. Markos decided to appear at a morning practice, which didn't sit well with Carla Esparza, who confronted Markos to try to get her to leave; Markos did not. She defeated Herrig via scarfhold armbar, in the first round.

In the last episode of the season, Markos was paired up against Rose Namajunas in the semifinal. Markos lost via first round submission.

Ultimate Fighting Championship
Markos made her promotional debut at The Ultimate Fighter 20 Finale, taking on fellow semi-finalist Jessica Penne. She lost in a close split decision and was awarded Fight of the Night.

Markos filled in for the injured Cláudia Gadelha at UFC 186, taking on Aisling Daly. She won via unanimous decision.

Markos faced promotional newcomer Karolina Kowalkiewicz on December 19, 2015 at UFC on Fox 17. She lost the fight by unanimous decision.

Markos defeated Jocelyn Jones-Lybarger at UFC Fight Night 89 on June 18, 2016, by unanimous decision.

Markos took on Cortney Casey at UFC 202; she lost in the first round via armbar.

Markos next faced Carla Esparza on February 19, 2017 at UFC Fight Night: Lewis vs. Browne. She won the fight by split decision.

On August 5, 2017, Markos faced Alexa Grasso at UFC Fight Night: Pettis vs. Moreno. Grasso came in at 119 lbs, three pounds over the strawweight limit, at weigh-ins, and was fined 20% of her purse, which went to Markos. The bout proceeded at a catchweight. Markos lost the fight via split decision.

Markos faced Juliana Lima on January 27, 2018 at UFC on Fox 27. She won the fight via unanimous decision.

Markos faced Nina Ansaroff on July 28, 2018 at UFC on Fox 30. She lost the fight via unanimous decision.

Markos faced promotional newcomer Marina Rodriguez on September 22, 2018 at UFC Fight Night 137. The back and forth contest was ultimately ruled a majority draw.

Markos faced Angela Hill on March 23, 2019 at UFC Fight Night: Thompson vs. Pettis. She won the fight due to an armbar submission in the first round. This win earned her the Performance of the Night award.

Markos faced Cláudia Gadelha on July 6, 2019 at UFC 239. She lost the fight via unanimous decision.

Markos faced Ashley Yoder on October 26, 2019 at UFC on ESPN+ 20. She won the fight via split decision.

Markos faced Amanda Ribas, replacing injured Paige VanZant on March 14, 2020 at UFC Fight Night 170.  She lost the fight via unanimous decision.

Markos faced Mackenzie Dern on September 19, 2020 at UFC Fight Night 178. She lost the fight via submission in the first round.

Markos faced promotional newcomer Kanako Murata, replacing injured Lívia Renata Souza, on November 14, 2020 at UFC Fight Night: Felder vs. dos Anjos. She lost the fight via unanimous decision.

Markos was scheduled to face Luana Pinheiro on March 27, 2021 at UFC 260. However, Markos was removed from the card on March 18 after testing positive for COVID-19. The bout was rescheduled for May 1, 2021 at UFC on ESPN: Reyes vs. Procházka. Markos lost the bout via disqualification in the first round after accidentally upkicking Pinheiro in the head, resulting in Pinheiro being unable to continue.

Markos faced Lívia Renata Souza on October 23, 2021 at UFC Fight Night 196. She won the fight via unanimous decision.

After her last bout, it was announced that her UFC contract was not renewed.

Championships and achievements

Mixed martial arts
Ultimate Fighting Championship
 Fight of the Night (One time) vs. Jessica Penne
Performance of the Night (One time) vs. Angela Hill
2nd-most fights in the UFC Strawweight division (18)

Provincial Fighting Championships
Provincial FC Strawweight Title (One time)

Mixed martial arts record

|-
|Win
|align=center|
|Lívia Renata Souza
|Decision (unanimous)
|UFC Fight Night: Costa vs. Vettori
|
|align=center|3
|align=center|5:00
|Las Vegas, Nevada, United States
|
|-
|Loss
|align=center|
|Luana Pinheiro
|DQ (illegal upkick)
|UFC on ESPN: Reyes vs. Procházka
|
|align=center|1
|align=center|4:16	
|Las Vegas, Nevada, United States
|
|-
|Loss
|align=center|
|Kanako Murata
|Decision (unanimous)
|UFC Fight Night: Felder vs. dos Anjos
|
|align=center|3
|align=center|5:00
|Las Vegas, Nevada, United States
|
|-
|Loss
|align=center|10–9–1
|Mackenzie Dern
|Submission (armbar)
|UFC Fight Night: Covington vs. Woodley
|
|align=center|1
|align=center|3:44
|Las Vegas, Nevada, United States
|
|-
|Loss
|align=center|10–8–1
|Amanda Ribas
|Decision (unanimous)
|UFC Fight Night: Lee vs. Oliveira 
|
|align=center|3
|align=center|5:00
|Brasília, Brazil
|
|-
|Win
|align=center|10–7–1
|Ashley Yoder
|Decision (split)
|UFC Fight Night: Maia vs. Askren 
|
|align=center|3
|align=center|5:00
|Kallang, Singapore
| 
|-
|Loss
|align=center|9–7–1
|Cláudia Gadelha
|Decision (unanimous)
|UFC 239 
|
|align=center|3
|align=center|5:00
|Las Vegas, Nevada, United States
|
|-
|Win
|align=center|9–6–1
|Angela Hill
| Submission (armbar)
|UFC Fight Night: Thompson vs. Pettis 
|
|align=center|1
|align=center|4:24
|Nashville, Tennessee, United States
|
|-
|Draw
|align=center|8–6–1
|Marina Rodriguez
|Draw (majority)
|UFC Fight Night: Santos vs. Anders 
|
|align=center|3
|align=center|5:00
|São Paulo, Brazil
|
|-
|Loss
|align=center|8–6
|Nina Ansaroff
|Decision (unanimous)
|UFC on Fox: Alvarez vs. Poirier 2 
|
|align=center|3
|align=center|5:00
|Calgary, Alberta, Canada
|
|-
|Win
|align=center|8–5
|Juliana Lima
|Decision (unanimous)
|UFC on Fox: Jacaré vs. Brunson 2 
|
|align=center|3
|align=center|5:00
|Charlotte, North Carolina, United States
|
|-
|Loss
|align=center|7–5
|Alexa Grasso
|Decision (split)
|UFC Fight Night: Pettis vs. Moreno
|
|align=center|3
|align=center|5:00
|Mexico City, Mexico
|
|-
|Win
|align=center|7–4
|Carla Esparza
|Decision (split)
|UFC Fight Night: Lewis vs. Browne
|
|align=center|3
|align=center|5:00
|Halifax, Nova Scotia, Canada
|
|-
|Loss
|align=center|6–4
|Cortney Casey
|Submission (armbar)
|UFC 202
|
|align=center|1
|align=center|4:34
|Las Vegas, Nevada, United States
|
|-
|Win
|align=center|6–3
|Jocelyn Jones-Lybarger
|Decision (unanimous)
|UFC Fight Night: MacDonald vs. Thompson
|
|align=center|3
|align=center|5:00
|Ottawa, Ontario, Canada
|
|-
|Loss
|align=center| 5–3
|Karolina Kowalkiewicz
|Decision (unanimous)
|UFC on Fox: dos Anjos vs. Cowboy 2 
|
|align=center|3
|align=center|5:00
|Orlando, Florida, United States
|
|-
| Win
|align=center| 5–2
|Aisling Daly
|Decision (unanimous)
|UFC 186
|April 25, 2015
|align=center|3
|align=center|5:00
|Montreal, Quebec, Canada
|
|-
| Loss
|align=center| 4–2
| Jessica Penne
| Decision (split)
|The Ultimate Fighter: A Champion Will Be Crowned Finale
|December 12, 2014
|align=center|3
|align=center|5:00
|Las Vegas, Nevada, United States
|
|-
| Win
|align=center| 4–1
| Lynnell House
| Submission (armbar)
|PFC 2: Fight Night
|March 8, 2014
|align=center|1
|align=center|1:57
|London, Ontario, Canada
|
|-
| Loss
|align=center| 3–1
| Justine Kish
| Decision (unanimous)
|RFA 12: Ortega vs. Koch
|January 24, 2014
|align=center|3
|align=center|5:00
|Los Angeles, California, United States
|
|-
| Win
|align=center| 3–0
| Kara Kirsh
| Decision (unanimous)
|PFC 1: Unrivaled
|October 26, 2013
|align=center|3
|align=center|5:00
|London, Ontario, Canada
|
|-
| Win
|align=center| 2–0
| Ashley Nichols
| Submission (armbar)
|Wreck MMA 2.0
|March 28, 2013
|align=center|1
|align=center|3:06
|Gatineau, Quebec, Canada
|
|-
| Win
|align=center| 1–0
| Allanna Jones
| Submission (armbar)
|IFL 51: No Guts, No Glory
|November 17, 2012
|align=center|3
|align=center|3:14
|Auburn Hills, Michigan, United States
|
|-

Mixed martial arts exhibition record

|-
|Loss
|align=center|2–1
| Rose Namajunas
| Submission (kimura) 
| rowspan=3|The Ultimate Fighter: A Champion Will Be Crowned
| (airdate)
|align=center|1
|align=center|2:44
| rowspan=3|Las Vegas, Nevada, United States
|
|-
|Win
|align=center|2–0
| Felice Herrig
| Submission (scarf-hold armlock)
| (airdate)
|align=center|1
|align=center|2:46
|
|-
|Win
|align=center|1–0
| Tecia Torres
| Decision (unanimous)
| (airdate)
|align=center|3
|align=center|5:00
|

Amateur mixed martial arts record

|-
| Win
|align=center| 4–2
| Bernice Booth
| TKO (punches)
|XCC 64.5 - Battle at the Border 11
|November 13, 2010
|align=center|1
|align=center|2:27
|Port Huron, Michigan, United States
|
|-
| Win
|align=center| 3–2
| Bernice Booth
| Submission (armbar)
|XCC 64 - Battle at the Border 10
|August 28, 2010
|align=center|2
|align=center|1:31
|Walpole Island, Ontario, Canada
|
|-
| Win
|align=center| 2–2
| Alibeth Rall Milliron
| Decision (unanimous)
|IFL - Prepare for Impact
|May 8, 2010
|align=center|3
|align=center|3:00
|Auburn Hills, Michigan, United States
|
|-
| Loss
|align=center| 1–2
| Kelly Warren
| Submission (rear-naked choke)
|IFL - Malice at the Palace
|January 30, 2010
|align=center|2
|align=center|2:35
|Auburn Hills, Michigan, United States
|
|-
| Loss
|align=center| 1–1
| Kelly Warren
| Decision (unanimous)
|IFL - Righteous Rumble
|November 14, 2009
|align=center|3
|align=center|3:00
|Auburn Hills, Michigan, United States
|
|-
| Win
|align=center| 1–0
| Tanya Lohr
| Decision (unanimous)
|IFL - No Pain, No Gain
|September 19, 2009
|align=center|3
|align=center|3:00
|Rochester Hills, Michigan, United States
|
|-

See also
List of female mixed martial artists
List of Canadian UFC fighters

References

External links
 
 

Living people
1985 births
Canadian female mixed martial artists
Iraqi female mixed martial artists
Strawweight mixed martial artists
Mixed martial artists utilizing wrestling
Mixed martial artists utilizing Brazilian jiu-jitsu
Canadian practitioners of Brazilian jiu-jitsu
Iraqi practitioners of Brazilian jiu-jitsu
Female Brazilian jiu-jitsu practitioners
Iraqi emigrants to Canada
Sportspeople from Baghdad
Sportspeople from Windsor, Ontario
Canadian Eastern Catholics
Chaldean Catholics
Canadian people of Assyrian descent
Iraqi Eastern Catholics
People of Iraqi-Assyrian descent
Ultimate Fighting Championship female fighters
Assyrian sportspeople